Country-Wide Insurance Company is a New York auto insurance company which is family-owned.  All of Country-Wide’s agents,  representatives, underwriters and adjusters live in the tri-state area in or contiguous to New York City.

History
Country-Wide Insurance Company was established in New York on December 23, 1963. It has been licensed to write property and casualty business insurance since April 15, 1964. During a twenty-year time period Country-Wide grew from 35 employees to over 300.

Company
Country-Wide is a family-owned and operated business which primarily provides private passenger and commercial auto insurance to residents of New York City, the boroughs, and Long Island. The majority of the company’s business consists of smaller limits policies which comply with basic, minimum coverage required by New York State law.

Michael D. Jaffe is the Chairman and President.

External links
 Country-Wide Website

References

Financial services companies established in 1963
American companies established in 1963
Companies based in New York (state)
Insurance companies of the United States
Insurance companies based in New York City
Privately held companies based in New York City
1963 establishments in New York City